Yogesh Kumar Chawla is an Indian medical doctor, hepatologist and has served as the director of the  Post Graduate Institute of Medical Education and Research (PGIMER), Chandigarh. He graduated in medicine from the Netaji Subhash Chandra Bose Medical College, Jabalpur, secured a master's degree (MD) in gastroenterology from the same college before joining PGIMER in 1983 as a member of faculty of the department of hepatology and became the head of the department in 1999. Chawla, a recipient of the 1999 Dr. B. C. Roy Award and an elected fellow of the National Academy of Medical Sciences was honoured by the Government of India in 2015 with Padma Shri, the fourth highest Indian civilian award.

See also

 Hepatology
 Gastroenterology

References

Recipients of the Padma Shri in medicine
Living people
Indian medical academics
Indian hepatologists
Dr. B. C. Roy Award winners
Fellows of the National Academy of Medical Sciences
Year of birth missing (living people)
Place of birth missing (living people)
20th-century Indian medical doctors
Academic staff of the Postgraduate Institute of Medical Education and Research